The Juazeiro River is a river of Bahia state in eastern Brazil.

See also
List of rivers of Bahia

References
Brazilian Ministry of Transport

Rivers of Bahia